Whittier Mill Village, originally Chattahoochee, a recognized neighborhood of Atlanta on the Upper Westside of Atlanta. It is roughly contiguous with the Whittier Mills Historic District, both locally- and NRHP-listed. The mill and the adjacent village were founded in 1895. The area is a good example of a Southern mill and village. Only remnants of the mill remain. However, the housing areas mostly have survived.

In 2001, the historic district included 98 contributing buildings, one contributing structure, and one contributing site, as well as 16 non-contributing buildings.

References

External links
 "Whittier Mill", City of Atlanta - detailed history, architectural description, and further references about Whittier Mill
 Whitter Mill Village Neighborhood Association
 "Whittier Mill Village", Creative Loafing 
 Whittier Cotton Mill and Village historical marker

Historic districts on the National Register of Historic Places in Georgia (U.S. state)
Company towns in Georgia (U.S. state)
Cotton mills in the United States
National Register of Historic Places in Atlanta
Colonial Revival architecture in Georgia (U.S. state)
Buildings and structures completed in 1895